Prentice Gautt (February 8, 1938 – March 17, 2005) was an American football running back for the University of Oklahoma football team from 1956 to 1959.  Gautt was the first black football player at the University of Oklahoma where he wore #38.

When former Sooners coach Bud Wilkinson was pressured against giving Gautt a scholarship, a group of black doctors and pharmacists gave him money to attend the school. Within a year, Gautt had a scholarship and the donated money was given to another black student.  Gautt then became a two-time All-Big Eight player. His senior year, he was named to the Academic All-American team.

He played football professionally in the NFL with the Cleveland Browns (one year) and St. Louis Cardinals (six years).

After the NFL, Gautt coached football at Missouri while earning his Ph.D. in psychology.  He then started a career in athletics administration, first as an assistant commissioner for the Big Eight Conference and as a special assistant to the commissioner of the Big 12 Conference.

Gautt played high school football at Douglass High School in Oklahoma City.  His senior year, he became the first black player to play in the All-State game and he earned MVP honors.

Gautt died on March 17, 2005, from flu-like symptoms.

He was posthumously given the 2005 Outstanding Contribution to Amateur Football Award by The National Football Foundation (NFF) & College Football Hall of Fame  in May 2005.

External links
 Dr. Prentice Gautt Big 12 Postgraduate Scholarship Recipients
 Brown v. Board of Education Profiles
 Gautt, Prentice Encyclopedia of Oklahoma History and Culture

1938 births
2005 deaths
African-American players of American football
Sportspeople from Oklahoma City
American football running backs
Oklahoma Sooners football players
Cleveland Browns players
St. Louis Cardinals (football) players
Missouri Tigers football coaches
University of Missouri alumni
20th-century African-American sportspeople
21st-century African-American people